United Kingdom International Search and Rescue Team (UK-ISAR) is a search and rescue team from the United Kingdom that responds to humanitarian accidents or disasters on behalf of the UK Government. The current team structure is classified by the United Nations as a ‘Heavy USAR Team’ (urban Search and Rescue) under the International Search and Rescue Advisory Group (INSARAG) guidelines.

Membership 
UK-ISAR was founded in 1993, and now consists of volunteers from 15 fire and rescue services (FRSs). Each service contributes personnel and equipment when requested.

The current FRSs that provide UK-ISAR volunteers include:

 Merseyside Fire and Rescue Service Search and Rescue Team
Greater Manchester Fire and Rescue Service
 Cheshire Fire and Rescue Service
Hampshire & Isle of Wight Fire and Rescue Service
Kent Fire and Rescue Service
Leicestershire Fire and Rescue Service
Lincolnshire Fire & Rescue
London Fire Brigade
 Scottish Fire and Rescue Service
 South Wales Fire & Rescue Service
 Mid & West Wales Fire & Rescue Service
 West Midlands Fire Service

Capabilities 

In line with United Nations guidelines, the entire national team are packed and ready to deploy to an affected country within 10 hours of an official request for assistance.

In addition to search and rescue operations, UK-ISAR support the UK Emergency Medical Team with logistical expertise for their bases when they are deployed.

Previous deployments 

Over the last 25 years the team has successfully carried out search, rescue and relief missions in  Iraq, Turkey, Algeria, Pakistan, India, Iran, Mozambique, Indonesia, Haiti, New Zealand, Japan, Bosnia and Nepal. Members have also attended many international training exercises including Poland, Italy, USA, and Germany.

References 

Rescue agencies